The 1979–80 South-West Indian Ocean cyclone season was an above-average cyclone season. The season officially ran from November 1, 1979, to April 30, 1980.

Systems

Tropical Cyclone Tony

Over the next couple of days the depression gradually developed further before at 1800 UTC on 27 August, TCWC Perth estimated that it had become a tropical cyclone and named it Tony. During the next day, Tony moved into the South West Indian Ocean and weakened gradually before it dissipated during 31 August. Neither the Mauritius or Reunion meteorological services monitored Tony as a tropical cyclone while it was active, while it was not included in the JTWC's analysis of the season.

Intense Tropical Cyclone Albine

Albine existed from 25 November to 6 December.

Intense Tropical Cyclone Viola–Claudette

Cyclone Viola entered the basin on December 18 from the Australian region, whereupon it became Cyclone Claudette. The storm caused 5 fatalities, 257 injuries, and US$175 million in damage on the island. About 5,000 houses were destroyed or severely damaged. Effects on neighboring Réunion were limited to  wind gusts and some rainfall.

Moderate Tropical Storm Berenice

Berenice existed from 15 December to 21 December.

Tropical Depression Wilf–Danitza

Wilf-Danitza existed from 23 December 1979, to 3 January 1980.

Intense Tropical Cyclone Hyacinthe

Hyacinthe formed on January 15, 1980, to the northeast of Mauritius in the southern Indian Ocean. Initially it moved to the west-southwest, and while slowly intensifying it passed north of the French overseas department of Réunion. On January 19, Météo-France estimated that the storm had intensified to a tropical cyclone. Hyacinthe looped to the south of eastern Madagascar and weakened, although it restrengthened after turning to the east. The storm executed another loop to the southwest of Réunion, passing near the island for a second and later third time. Hyacinthe became extratropical on January 29 after turning southward, dissipating two days later.

Tropical Cyclone Hyacinthe set several worldwide tropical cyclone rainfall records in Réunion in the Southwestern Indian Ocean, including a peak total of 5678 mm (223.5 inches).  For twelve days, Hyacinthe dropped torrential rainfall on Réunion; nearly all of the island received more than 1 m (3.3 ft) of precipitation. Over a 15‑day period from January 14 to January 28,  of rainfall were recorded at Commerson's Crater, a volcano. The heaviest rainfall occurred through a process called orographic lift in the mountainous interior, leading to hundreds of landslides. Widespread floods washed out roads and isolated three villages. Hyacinthe caused heavy damage to crops and damaged or destroyed 2,000 houses. Losses from the storm totaled $167 million (1980 USD, 676 million francs), and 25 people were killed.

Intense Tropical Cyclone Jacinthe

Jacinthe existed from 1 February to 7 February.

Severe Tropical Storm Kolia

Kolia existed from 25 February to 13 March. The storm executed two loops near the Mascarene Islands, bringing the storm between Réunion and Mauritius twice. Wind gusts reached  on Mauritius.

Intense Tropical Cyclone Laure

Laure existed from 8 March to 17 March.

Moderate Tropical Storm 22S

22S existed from 14 March to 20 March.

See also
Atlantic hurricane seasons: 1979, 1980
Eastern Pacific hurricane seasons: 1979, 1980
Western Pacific typhoon seasons: 1979, 1980
North Indian Ocean cyclone seasons: 1979, 1980

References

 
South-West Indian Ocean cyclone seasons
1979–80 Southern Hemisphere tropical cyclone season
Tropical cyclones in 1980